Romania competed at the 2020 Winter Youth Olympics in Lausanne, Switzerland from 9 to 22 January 2020.

Medalists
Medals awarded to participants of mixed-NOC teams are represented in italics. These medals are not counted towards the individual NOC medal tally.

Alpine skiing

Boys

Girls

Biathlon

Boys

Girls

Mixed

Bobsleigh

Cross-country skiing 

Boys

Ice hockey

Mixed NOC 3x3 tournament 

Boys
Csongor Antal

Girls
Sonja David
Emilia Munteanu

Luge

Boys

Girls

Mixed team relay

Ski jumping

Boys

Girls

Ski mountaineering

Individual

Sprint

Mixed

Snowboarding

Snowboard cross

Speed skating

Girls

Mass Start

Mixed

See also
Romania at the 2020 Summer Olympics

References

2020 in Romanian sport
Nations at the 2020 Winter Youth Olympics
Romania at the Youth Olympics